Pichaqani (Aymara pichaqa, phichaqa, piqacha a big needle, -ni a suffix, "the one with a big needle", also spelled Pichacani) is a mountain in the Andes of Bolivia which reaches a height of approximately . It is located in the Oruro Department, Challapata Province, Challapata Municipality. Pichaqani lies at the Berenguela River, southwest of Kuntur Uta.

References 

Mountains of Oruro Department